The 2020 California Democratic presidential primary took place on March 3, 2020, as one of 15 contests scheduled on Super Tuesday in the Democratic Party primaries for the 2020 presidential election, following the South Carolina primary the weekend before. The California primary formed an unusual part of Super Tuesday as it had historically departed from its typical June date. It was a semi-closed primary, with the state awarding 494 delegates towards the 2020 Democratic National Convention, of which 415 were pledged delegates allocated on the basis of the results of the primary.

Senator Bernie Sanders won the highly desired primary, which bore the most delegates of the entire primary cycle by far, improving on his polling average by 3% and winning 36% of the vote and 225 delegates. Former vice president Joe Biden, however, aided by among others the endorsements of Pete Buttigieg and Amy Klobuchar, also had a much stronger second place finish than expected and took 28% of the vote and 172 delegates, matching his successful Super Tuesday momentum and minimizing his delegate deficit, which was also leveled by his other wins on that day. Ultimately, his California loss did not hinder Biden from becoming the new frontrunner for the Democratic nomination. Elizabeth Warren and Michael Bloomberg did not surpass the 15% threshold and only got 11 and 7 delegates in a few districts, respectively.

Procedure
California was one of 14 states and one territory that held its primaries on March 3, 2020, also known as "Super Tuesday", having joined other states on the date after the signing of the Prime Time Primary Act by Governor Jerry Brown on September 27, 2017, moving the primary from its traditional June date in an effort to increase the influence of the delegate-rich state in the nomination process.

Candidates were allowed to obtain ballot access in a number of ways. They needed to have.:

 "...qualified for funding under the Federal Election Campaign Act of 1974 (52 U.S.C. Sec. 30101, et seq.)
 appeared as a candidate in a national presidential debate hosted by a political party qualified to participate in a primary election, with at least two participating candidates, and publicly available for viewing by voters in more than one state during the current presidential election cycle. A “political party qualified to participate in a primary election” means any political party qualified in California, a major or minor-ballot qualified political party in another state, or a national committee of a political party recognized by the Federal Election Commission
 placed or qualified for placement on a presidential primary ballot or a caucus ballot of a major or minor ballot-qualified political party in at least one other state in the current presidential election cycle
 candidate or qualified to be a candidate in a caucus of a major or minor ballot-qualified political party in at least one other state in the current presidential election cycle
 has the following: current presidential campaign internet website or webpage hosted by the candidate or a qualified political party, and a written request submitted on the candidate's behalf by a party qualified to participate in the primary election to the Secretary of State requesting the candidate be placed on the presidential primary ballot."

If they did not have at least one of those qualifications, they needed to submit petitions of 500 signatures from each of the state's congressional districts obtained between November 4 and December 13, 2019. The official list of qualified candidates was released on December 6, 2019. Unqualified candidates were required to submit their petitions by this date.

Military and overseas mail-in ballots were sent out on January 3, 2020, and domestic mail-in ballots were requested and sent out from February 3 to February 25. Early voting centers opened for business on February 22 and continued until March 3. Election day voting took place throughout the state from 7 a.m. until 8 p.m. In the semi-closed primary, candidates had to meet a threshold of 15 percent at the congressional district or statewide level in order to be considered viable. The 415 pledged delegates to the 2020 Democratic National Convention were allocated proportionally on the basis of the results of the primary. Of these, between 4 and 7 were allocated to each of the state's 53 congressional districts, and another 54 were allocated to party leaders and elected officials (PLEO delegates), in addition to 90 at-large delegates. The Super Tuesday primary as part of Stage I on the primary timetable received no bonus delegates, in order to disperse the primaries between more different date clusters and keep too many states from hoarding on the first shared date or on a March date in general.

Following the primary, district-level delegates to the national convention were elected on June 7, 2020 (postponed from April 19 due to the COVID-19 pandemic) in the post-primary caucus. Should presidential candidates have been allocated more delegates based on the results of the primary than delegate candidates presented, then supplemental delegates would have been elected at caucuses on May 9, 2020. The national convention delegation meeting was subsequently held on June 28, 2020 (postponed from May 17) during the state convention, to vote on the 54 pledged PLEO and 90 at-large delegates for the Democratic National Convention. The delegation also included 79 unpledged PLEO delegates: 31 members of the Democratic National Committee, 47 members of Congress (both senators, including former candidate Kamala Harris, and 45 representatives, including former candidate Eric Swalwell), and the governor Gavin Newsom.

Candidates
The following candidates appear in the Certified List of Statewide Candidates:

Running
 
Joe Biden
Michael Bloomberg
Mosie Boyd
Roque "Rocky" De La Fuente III
Michael A. Ellinger
Tulsi Gabbard
Mark Stewart Greenstein
Bernie Sanders
Elizabeth Warren

Withdrawn

Michael Bennet
Cory Booker
Pete Buttigieg
Julian Castro
John Delaney
Amy Klobuchar
Deval Patrick
Joe Sestak
Tom Steyer
Marianne Williamson
Andrew Yang

Polling

Results

See also 
2020 California Republican presidential primary

Notes

References

External links
The Green Papers delegate allocation summary
California Democratic Party draft delegate selection plan
FiveThirtyEight California primary poll tracker

California Democratic
Democratic primary
2020